Rob LeDonne is an American writer for  television and print media. He has written comedy material for Late Night with Jimmy Fallon, The Tonight Show with Jay Leno, the MTV Video Music Awards, and the Teen Choice Awards.

He has also conducted interviews and written feature articles for The New York Times, Rolling Stone, Surfer, Nylon Guys, Paste, American Songwriter, and The Guardian.

References 

Living people
American comedy writers
1987 births